There are at least 83 named lakes and reservoirs in Prairie County, Arkansas.

Lakes
Alligator Lake, el.  
Bean Lake, el.  
Belcher Lake, el.  
Big Brushy Lake, el.  
Big Twin Lake, el.  
Big Twin Lake, el.  
Prairie County, el.  
Blind Basin, el.  
Blue Hole, el.  
Blue Lake, el.  
Blue Lake, el.  
Bob Williams Lake, el.  
Cagles Eddy, el.  
Choctaw Lake, el.  
Clear Lake, el.  
Coitier Basin, el.  
Cooper Lake, el.  
Goose Basin, el.  
Goose Pond, el.  
Graveyard Slough, el.  
Hall's Lake, el.  
Harvey Lake, el.  
Hendricks Lake, el.  
Hicks Lake, el.  
Hill Lake, el.  
Hodges Lake, el.  
Horn Lake, el.  
Horseshoe Lake, el.  
Horseshoe Lake, el.  
Horseshoe Lake, el.  
Jake Williams Lake, el.  
Keathley Pond, el.  
Lindermans Lake, el.  
Little Brushy Lake, el.  
Little Gum Pond, el.  
Little Lake, el.  
Little Twin Lake, el.  
Loggy Bayou, el.  
Maloy Lake, el.  
Miller Lake, el.  
Moore's Lake, el.  
 Old River Lake, el.  
 Old River Lake, el.  
 Peppers Lake, el.  
 Roc Roe Lake, el.  
 Round Basin, el.  
 Round Lake, el.  
 Slaughters Lake, el.  
 Slippery Lake, el.  
 Spring Lake, el.  
 Straight Lake, el.  
 The Basin, el.  
 Twin Lakes, el.  
 Twin Lakes, el.  
 Tyler Lake, el.  
 Upshaw Lake, el.  
 Webb Lake, el.

Reservoirs
Aker Reservoir, el.  
Argo Reservoir, el.  
Catfish Lake, el.  
Crowley Lake, el.  
Eddy Lake, el.  
Floyds Reservoir, el.  
Frakers Reservoir, el.  
Hansons Reservoir, el.  
Hartz Reservoir, el.  
Holloway Pond, el.  
Jerome Lake, el.  
Joe Uhiren Reservoir, el.  
Lake Des Arc, el.  
Lake Treadway, el.  
Lost Island Reservoir, el.  
Menett Reservoir, el.  
Miers Lake, el.  
Newkirks Reservoir Number 1, el.  
Newkirks Reservoir Number 2, el.  
Omni Pond, el.  
Stroh Reservoir, el.  
Tates Reservoir, el.  
Thomas Reservoir Number 2, el.  
Whiskey Creek Reservoir, el.  
Wing Meade Reservoir, el.  
Wolf Reservoir, el.

See also
 List of lakes in Arkansas

Notes

Bodies of water of Prairie County, Arkansas
Prairie